Nduga Regency is one of the regencies (kabupaten) in the Indonesian province of Highland Papua. Nduga Regency was separated from Jayawijaya Regency on 4 January 2008 in accordance with Law No. 6/2008. It covers an area of 12,941 km2, and had a population of 79,053 at the 2010 Census and 106,533 at the 2020 Census. The administrative centre is at Kenyam.

Administrative Districts
In 2010 the Nduga Regency comprised eight districts (distrik), listed below with their areas and populations at the 2010 Census. 

Since 2010, the number of districts has been raised to thirty-two by the splitting of existing districts. The revised 32 districts are tabulated below with their areas and their populations at the 2020 Census. The table also includes the location of the district administrative centres, the number of administrative villages (rural desa and urban kelurahan) in each district and its post code.

References

External links
Statistics publications from Statistics Indonesia (BPS)

Regencies of Highland Papua